Lower Falls was one of the nine district electoral areas which existed in Belfast, Northern Ireland from 1985 to 2014. Located in the west of the city, the district elected five members to Belfast City Council and contained the wards of Beechmount; Clonard; Falls; Upper Springfield; and Whiterock. Lower Falls formed part of the Belfast West constituencies for the Northern Ireland Assembly and UK Parliament. The district, along with the neighbouring Upper Falls district took its name from the Falls Road, one of the main arterial routes in the west of the city.

History
Lower Falls was created for the 1985 local elections. The Falls and Clonard wards had previously been in Area F, with the remaining wards part of Area D. It was abolished for the 2014 local elections. The Falls and Clonard wards joined the Court District Electoral Area, while the remaining wards became part of a new Black Mountain District Electoral Area.

Wards

Councillors

2011 Elections

See also
Belfast City Council
Electoral wards of Belfast
Local government in Northern Ireland
Members of Belfast City Council

References

Electoral wards of Belfast
1985 establishments in Northern Ireland
2014 disestablishments in Northern Ireland
Former District Electoral Areas of Belfast